Lillian Drew (August 1882 – February 4, 1924), born Lillian Margaret Flannery, was an American actress in silent films.

Early life 
Lillian Margaret Flannery was born in Chicago, the daughter of Patrick J. Flannery and Marguerite M. Flannery. All of her grandparents were born in Ireland.

Career 
Drew made more than eighty silent films, mostly short films, for Essanay Studios in Chicago and Chattanooga. She was known for her riding skills, and preference for "heavy dramatic" roles. She appeared with Gloria Swanson in The Fable of Elvira and Farina and the Meal Ticket (1915). Other  films with Drew include  (1914),  (1915), (1915), (1916),  (1916), (1916), The Other Man (1916),  (1916) (1916),  (1916), Uneasy Money (1918), and Ruggles of Red Gap (1918). Her last movie was Children of Jazz (1923) with Ricardo Cortez. She worked as a dressmaker in her last years.

Personal life 
Lillian Drew married fellow actor and director E. H. Calvert in 1907. They had a son, William Calvert, who became a child actor. The Calverts were separated, and she was recovering from an injury, when she died in Chicago in 1924, from an overdose of barbital, aged 41 years. Her death was ruled accidental by a coroner's jury.

References

External links 
 

1882 births
1924 deaths
American film actresses
American silent film actresses
20th-century American actresses
Actresses from Chicago